Abbotsholme School is a co-educational private boarding and day school. The school is situated on a 140-acre campus on the banks of the River Dove in Derbyshire, England near the county border and the village of Rocester in Staffordshire. It is a member of the Society of Heads (formerly Society of Headmasters & Headmistresses of Independent Schools) and is a Round Square school.

History 

Abbotsholme was founded by the Scottish academic and educationalist Cecil Reddie as an experiment in his progressive educational philosophies and theories. The school, then known "The New School", opened in 1889 to boys aged 10 to 19. From the very beginning, it departed from the structure of the traditional public school in favour of a less rigid environment and more liberal education.  "Eton collars" were discarded in favour of a more comfortable and practical uniform, and English, French and German were taught in place of Classics (Latin and Greek). The fine arts were introduced as core subjects, considered unusual at that time, since music was mostly taught at cathedral schools snd art at specialist art institutes. Practical skills such as animal husbandry and carpentry were integrated into the curriculum.

The school has been coeducational since 1969; girls now make up over one third of overall pupil numbers. 

In 2017 the school was bought by the Chinese company Achieve Education Ltd, owned by Mrs Tong Zhou, who sits on the Achieve Advisory Board. The directors of the school are now those of Achieve Education and are chaired by Mike Farmer, a former head of Kilgraston School.

Notable former pupils

 Roger Altounyan – physician and pharmacologist who pioneered the use of sodium cromoglycate as a preventative for asthma
 Sir Samuel Phillips Bedson, FRS  Professor of Bacteriology, University of London
 Alan Dower Blumlein, Electronics engineer and inventor
 Peter Crossley-Holland, Ethnomusicologist and composer
 Robin Gandy, Mathematician
 Edward James Martin Koppel, British-born American broadcast journalist,
 Alfred Angas Scott (1875-1923), motorcycle designer, inventor and founder of The Scott Motorcycle Company 
Ian Shapiro, political scientist
Olaf Stapledon (1886-1950) Novelist and philosopher; author of Last and First Men, Star Maker, and other works of speculative fiction.
 Lytton Strachey, British writer and critic
 Sir Alan Muir Wood, FRS FREng FICE, Civil Engineer
 Peter Gautrey, British soldier and diplomat

References

External links 
 School Website
 UK Boarding Schools Guide Profile
 Profile on the ISC website

Round Square schools
Educational institutions established in 1889
Boarding schools in Derbyshire
Private schools in Derbyshire
1889 establishments in England